Emma Barrandeguy (8 March 1914 – 19 December 2006) was an Argentine writer, journalist, poet, storyteller and playwright.

Barrandeguy was born in 1914 in Gualeguay, Entre Ríos. Her mother read poetry to her when Barrandeguy was very small. In 1937, she moved to Buenos Aires where she resided for 22 years. In 1939, she married an American circus acrobat, who left on an oil tanker and never returned to Buenos Aires. They had no children. At the age of 50, she began studies at the university.

Her first poems were published when she was 18. Her first book was published when she was 50; it contained poems which she wrote in a diary. Barrandeguy had various jobs, including archivist, writer, journalist, librarian, and jewelry sales. She published articles about astrology, and served as the private secretary of Salvadora Medina Onrubia de Botana, the spouse of Natalio Botana. For 20 years, she directed the cultural section in a local newspaper in Gualeguay, El Debate Cry. She also for the Gualeguaychú regional newspaper, La Verdad, and worked as a translator for the publishers of El Ateneo and Emecé.

Barrandeguy worked at the Institute of Cancer and died of cancer in 2006 at age 92 in Gualeguay.

Awards
She was awarded the Premio Fray Mocho in 1970 for the play "Amor saca amor"; and in 1985, for her novel "Crónicas de medio siglo".

Selected works 
 Poesías completas, 2009
 Mastronardi-Gombrowicz: una amistad singular, 2004
 Habitaciones, 2002
 Salvadora, una mujer de Crítica, 1997
 Camino hecho, 1996
 Crónica de medio siglo, 1986	
 Refracciones, 1986
 Crónica de medio siglo, 1984
 Los pobladores, 1983
 No digo que mi país es poderoso, 1982
 Amor saca amor (teatro), 1970
 El andamio (novela), 1964
 Cartas, 1943
 Las puertas, 1964
 Poemas, 1934–35

See also
 List of Argentine writers

References

1914 births
2006 deaths
20th-century Argentine women writers
20th-century Argentine writers
Argentine women journalists
Argentine women poets
Argentine dramatists and playwrights
People from Gualeguay Department
Women dramatists and playwrights
20th-century Argentine poets
20th-century dramatists and playwrights